Linda Hargreaves is a British actress who has appeared on both stage and screen. She made her television debut in the BBC soap opera Doctors and has since returned to the soap on three separate occasions in different roles, most recently in the recurring role of Constance Buchanan. She has also appeared in various television series including Containment and Call the Midwife.

Life and career
Hargreaves is a graduate of the Birmingham School of Acting, completing her studies in 2012. In 2014, she made her television debut as Stephanie Preston in the BBC soap opera Doctors. In 2015, she portrayed a hotel maid in an episode of Londongrad. In 2016, Hargreaves appeared in various guest roles, including Pamela in an episode of the sixth series of Vera, a history teacher in Raised by Wolves and an audience member in Morgana Robinson's The Agency. The following year, she made her film debut as Mrs. Holding in the drama film Mad to Be Normal, before returning to Doctors, this time in the role of Dr. Liz Kewn. In 2018, Hargreaves appeared in an episode of the CBBC television series 4 O'Clock Club and played a passenger in the BBC political thriller series Bodyguard. She also portrayed Carla in the film Elizabeth Is Missing in 2019 and returned to Doctors for a third time as Kathy Richards in the episode "This Far and No Further".

In 2020, Hargreaves appeared in an episode of the Sky One comedy drama Brassic. Following this, she was cast in Containment, and portrayed Mrs. Kendrick on a recurring basis, appearing in five episodes. In 2021, Hargreaves played various characters in the ITV2 comedy The Emily Atack Show, appearing in numerous sketches. She also appeared in the films SeaView and Asylum, portraying the roles of Diane and Susie Winnie respectively. Since 2021, Hargreaves has appeared in Call the Midwife as Mrs. Wallace, making her debut in the tenth series and going on to appear in that year's Christmas special, before reprising her role for the eleventh series. In 2022, Hargreaves returned to Doctors for a fourth time, this time on a recurring basis as Constance Buchanan, the mother of established character Princess Buchanan (Laura White). She also appeared as Obi in the BBC television series Everything I Know About Love and is set to portray Sonia Bumbridge in the film Swede Caroline.

Hargreaves is also a stage actress, having appeared in productions such as The Yellow Doctress, Primetime and The Lost Hancock's. She also writes and produces her own comedy series on YouTube and has performed at the Edinburgh Festival Fringe, Birmingham Comedy Festival, the Women in Comedy Festival as well as the Wolverhampton and Manchester Comedy Festival.

Filmography

Stage

References

External links
 

21st-century British actresses
Actresses from Birmingham, West Midlands
Black British actresses
British film actresses
British soap opera actresses
British stage actresses
British television actresses
Living people
Year of birth missing (living people)